Dalton Baldwin (December 19, 1931 – December 12, 2019) was an American accompanist. He made more than 100 recordings and won numerous prizes, working with outstanding singers such as Gérard Souzay, Elly Ameling, Arleen Auger, and Jessye Norman. He visited southern Africa on numerous occasions, accompanying Gérard Souzay three times (in 1958 for the first time) and Elly Ameling twice (in 1973 for the first time).

He died on December 12, 2019, aged 87.

See also
 Debussy Mélodies (1980 recording)

References

External links
Classical Archives profile
 

American classical pianists
American male pianists
Classical accompanists
Piano pedagogues
American music educators
1931 births
2019 deaths
20th-century American pianists
21st-century classical pianists
20th-century American male musicians
21st-century American male musicians
21st-century American pianists
Knights of the Order of Cultural Merit (Monaco)